is a former Japanese pop singer and songwriter under the Giza Studio label.

Biography
Aiko's interest in music was inspired by her mother's love for bossa nova and Latin pop, which have had a big influence on her songs.

2002-2003: Piece of Love
On 17 May 2002, she released debut single "Grand Blue". In the media it was used as an opening theme for Anime television series Tenshi na Konamaiki.

On 17 July, the Giza Studio has released cover album Giza studio MAI-K & Friends Hotrod Beach Party where she participated in cover song "Little Honda" and "Surfin' U.S.A." by The Beach Boys.

On the same day, she released first mini album Sol de verano. The promotional music videoclip covers the cover song "La Bamba" by Ritchie Valens. The album failed to reach on Oricon Weekly Charts.

On 26 July 2002, she appeared on Giza Studio live event Giza studio MAI-K & Friends Hotrod Beach Party Vol.1: 2002 Summer and performed here cover song.

On 6 November 2002, she released second single "Sun rise train". In the media it was used as a second opening theme for Anime television series Tenshi na Konamaiki.

On 18 December 2002, the debut single was included in the Giza Studio compilation album Giza Studio Masterpiece Blend 2002.

On 4 June 2003, she released third single "Himawari no you ni". In the media it was broadcast as an ending theme for NTV television program Mogumogu Gombo.

On 6 August 2003, she released fourth single "Nijiiro ni Hikaru Umi". In the media it was used as an ending theme for Anime television series Detective School Q.

On 25 September 2003, she released fifth single "Special Days". In the media it was used as an ending theme for Yomiuri TV program Pro no Domyaku.

On 19 November 2003, she released first studio album Piece of Love. The single "Special days" has received new arrangement under subtitle "album mix".

On 23 November 2003, she participated in cover song "Sono Ki ni Sasenaide" by Candies along with Saegusa Yuuka and Ai Takaoka. The cover song was recorded on cover album The Hit Parade produced by Tak Matsumoto.

On 17 December 2003, the single "Special Days" was included in the Giza Studio compilation album Giza Studio Masterpiece Blend 2003.

2004-2005: Message
On 24 March 2004, she released sixth single Omoide ni Sukuwaretemo. In this single, two of former members Makoto Miyoshi and Kazunobu Mashima from band Rumania Montevideo has provided musical composition. In the media it was broadcast as an theme song for Yomiuri TV program Pro no Domyaku.

On 28 July 2004, she released seventh single Da Da Da. In the media it was broadcast as an ending theme for TBS television program Sunday Japon.

On 5 February 2005, she released eighth single Fuyu no Urara. In the media it was used as an ending theme for TBS television program 8Ji Desu! Minna no Monday!.

On 11 May 2005, she released second studio album Message. The single Omoide ni Sukuwaretemo has received new arrangement under subtitle album mix. The album track Message was used in the media as an ending theme for the Nihon TV program Sekai! Chou Mane Tenkyuusho

On 20 July 2005, she released ninth single Te Quiero Te Amo: Natsu no Natsu no Koi. In the media it was broadcast as an ending theme for Nihon TV program Himitsu no Hiramekin

2006-2007: Sea and Shanti
On 1.1 January 2006, she released first music videoclip DVD Aiko Kitahara Visual Collection.

On 18 January 2006, she released tenth single Tango. It has multiple media promotion, it was used as an ending theme for Anime television series Fighting Beauty Wulong and broadcast as an opening theme for Chiba TV program MU-GEN〜Music Generations〜.

On 26 April 2006, she released eleventh single Mou Ichido Kimi ni Koishiteiru. In the media it was used as an ending theme for Anime television series Government Crime Investigation Agent Zaizen Jotaro

On 19 July 2006, she released twelfth single Moshi mo Umare Kawattara Mou Ichido Aishitekuremasuka?. It's the longest title she ever used for the single. In the media it was broadcast as an opening theme for Chiba TV program MU-GEN〜Music Generations〜. The B-side song Dreaming was also promoted in the media as an theme song for Ohsaka's Commercial facility EST (West Japan Railway Company).

On 9 August 2006, she released third studio album Sea.

On 1 November 2006, she released thirteenth single Mou Kokoro Yuretari Shinaide. It's the first song she has composed by herself. In the media it was used as a seventh ending theme for Anime television series MÄR.

On 21 March 2007, she released fourteenth single Sekaijuu Doko wo Sagashitemo. In the media it was used as an ending theme for Anime television series Kekkaishi.

On 22 April 2007, she released fifteenth single Samba Night. In the media it was broadcast as a theme song for Tokyo Broadcasting System Television program Doors 2007.

On 26 September 2007, she released final studio album Shanti.

2008-2011: Compilation album and retirement
On 6 August 2008, after more than year she released sixteenth single Amore: Koiseyo! Otome. The single has received three media broadcasts, as an ending theme for Chiba TV program Bilive, as a theme song for NTV program Nittele Poshlet and as a theme song for NTV television program Shiodome Event Bu.

On 8.10 January 2008, she released second music videoclip DVD Aiko Kitahara Visual Collection 2.

On 5 November 2008, she released seventeenth single Sono Egao yo Eien ni. In the media it was used as an ending theme for Anime television series Golgo 13.

On 4 February 2009, she released final single Harukaze ga Mau koro ni wa. The single received two media broadcasts, as an monthly theme song for Asahousou program Music File and as an opening theme for Nihon TV television program Nittele Poshlet.

On 24 June 2009, she released compilation album Aiko Kitahara Best. The album includes all released singles, some album tracks and four unreleased songs.

In 2011, after performing her last live show in Hills Factory, Aiko announced her retirement through her blog.

Aiko didn't made any appearances on television music programs.

In 2017 the official website has been removed.

During her career, she released eighteen singles, four studio albums, one mini album and one greatest hits album.

Discography

Singles

Albums

Studio albums

Compilation albums

Extended plays

Video albums

Magazine appearances
From J-Groove Magazine:
July 2002 Vol.21
September 2002 Vol.23
December 2002 Vol.26
July 2003 Vol.33
September 2003 Vol.35
May 2004 Vol.43
March 2005 Vol.53
September 2005 Vol.59
February 2006 Vol.64

From Music Freak Magazine:
May 2002 Vol.90: Grand Blue Interview
July 2002 Vol.92: Self Liner Notes Sol de verano
October 2002 Vol.95: Information
November 2002 Vol.96: Sun rise train Interview

References

External links
Official website: 
Official blog: 

Living people
Being Inc. artists
Anime musicians
Japanese women singer-songwriters
20th-century Japanese women singers
20th-century Japanese singers
1982 births